Felix 'Toti' Ochieng is the former head coach of the Kenya national rugby union sevens team. Felix had been the assistant coach and was promoted when Paul Treu resigned in late 2014.

References

Living people
Year of birth missing (living people)